Beautiful Justice is a 2019 Philippine television drama series action broadcast by GMA Network. It premiered on the network's Telebabad line up and worldwide on GMA Pinoy TV from September 9, 2019 to January 24, 2020, replacing Sahaya.

Series overview

Episodes

References

Lists of Philippine drama television series episodes